Ohr Somayach in South Africa is an affiliate of Ohr Somayach, Jerusalem, a network of Haredi yeshivas and Synagogues. Like its parent institution, it focuses on educating baal teshuvas ("returnees" to Orthodox Judaism). It has branches in Johannesburg and Cape Town.

Johannesburg's main campus, in Glenhazel, was founded by Dayan Boruch Rapoport, Rabbi Shmuel Moffson and Rabbi Larry Shain. it includes a full-time Yeshiva, headed by Rabbi  Shimon Wolpe. Its Bet Midrash was established in 1990, and its Kollel, Toras Chaim, in 1996 which is currently headed by Rabbi Yechezkil Auerbach and Rabbi Yoel Smith ; it operates the Ma'ayan Bina Midrasha.

In other locations, Ohr Somayach has a minyan in nearby Savoy Estate, while the  Sandton branch (est 1991) under Rabbi Ze’ev Kraines, is a “Shtiebel-like” shul and Bet Midrash, and also houses a nursery school. The Shaarei Torah Primary School is based on the main campus.
Ohr Somayach Cape Town is a community located in the heart of Sea Point.
"Ohrsom" is the young adults' division with its own Shul in Glenhazel, as well as a satellite campus in Sandton. The Sunny Road Shul is an affiliated community, comprising mainly young families.

The Meshech Chochmah Yeshiva , currently headed by Rabbi Shimon Wolpe, is based in the Ohr Sameyach Bet Midrash and is a fully functioning Yeshiva with three learning sessions a day.
Rabbi Michael Olitzki is the current Mashgiach and also serves as the second Rabbi.
Joining them currently is Rabbi Golombik who serves as the current afternoon Rabbi.

See also
Jewish education in South Africa under History of the Jews in South Africa
Orthodox yeshivas in South Africa

References

External links
Ohr Somayach International
Ohr Somayach Johannesburg
Ohr Somayach Sandton
Ohr Somayach Cape Town
ohrsom.com
Ma'ayan Bina

South Africa
Baalei teshuva institutions
Orthodox yeshivas in South Africa
Jews and Judaism in Cape Town
Jews and Judaism in Johannesburg